Sizzle may refer to:

People
 Young Sizzle, an American rapper

Arts, entertainment, and media
 Sizzle (1981 film), a 1981 American TV movie
 Sizzle (2008 film), a feature documentary about global warming
 Sizzle (album), an album by Sam Rivers
 Sizzle (Transformers), the name of some Transformers series characters
 Frizzle Sizzle, a Dutch teenage girl group of the 1980s

Other uses
 Sizzle (selector engine), an open source selector engine for the JavaScript library jQuery
 "All sizzle and no steak", an idiom referring to a thing or person which fails to measure up to its description or advanced promotion
 Cincinnati Sizzle, an American football team
 Sizzle cymbal, a cymbal to which rivets, chains or other rattles have been added to modify the sound

See also
 Sizzler (disambiguation)
 Taylor Swift, referred to affectionately by some as "T-Swizzle"